Normocapnia or normocarbia is a state of normal arterial carbon dioxide pressure, usually about 40 mmHg.

See also

References 
The Free Dictionary - Normocapnia

Diving medicine
Pulmonology